Catacaos is a town in the Piura Province, Piura Region, Peru. It is known for its gastronomy and crafts (or souvenirs).

Notable people
Judith Westphalen, painter

References

Populated places in the Piura Region